Saint James Second Street Baptist Church is a historic church at 210 Harding Street in Fort Worth, Texas.  The congregation was founded in 1895 by the Reverend J. Francis Robinson.  Construction of the church began in 1913, by architect Frank J. Singleton.  African-American contractor George Powell built the south wing, while B.G. Rhodes built the north wing. Short square entry towers frame the Gothic Revival style red-brick building, and the lancet-shaped art glass windows give it a fortress-like appearance.

Services were held in the basement until construction was finished in 1918.  For many years the church held graduation ceremonies for I.M. Terrell High School.  The church was designated as a Recorded Texas Historic Landmark in 1986. It was added to the National Register in 1999.  In 2004, an electrical fire sparked a three-alarm blaze and caused $100,000 in damage.

See also

National Register of Historic Places listings in Tarrant County, Texas
Recorded Texas Historic Landmarks in Tarrant County

References

External links

Architecture in Fort Worth: Greater St. James Baptist Church

Churches in Fort Worth, Texas
Baptist churches in Texas
Churches on the National Register of Historic Places in Texas
National Register of Historic Places in Fort Worth, Texas
Churches completed in 1913
20th-century Baptist churches in the United States
1913 establishments in Texas
Recorded Texas Historic Landmarks